The , commonly abbreviated as , is an early anthology of the waka form of Japanese poetry, dating from the Heian period. An imperial anthology, it was conceived by Emperor Uda and published by order of his son Emperor Daigo in about 905. Its finished form dates to  920, though according to several historical accounts the last poem was added to the collection in 914.

The compilers of the anthology were four court poets, led by Ki no Tsurayuki and also including Ki no Tomonori (who died before its completion), Ōshikōchi no Mitsune, and Mibu no Tadamine.

Significance
It was the most influential realization of the ideas of poetry at the time, dictating the form and format of Japanese poetry until the late nineteenth century; it was the first anthology to divide itself into seasonal and love poems. The primacy of poems about the seasons pioneered by the Kokinshū continues even today.

The Japanese preface by Ki no Tsurayuki is also the beginning of Japanese criticism as distinct from the far more prevalent Chinese poetics in the literary circles of its day. The anthology also included a Classical Chinese preface authored by Ki no Yoshimochi. The idea of including old as well as new poems was another important innovation, one which was widely adopted in later works, both in prose and verse. The poems of the Kokinshū were ordered temporally; the love poems, for instance, though written by many different poets across large spans of time, are ordered in such a way that the reader may understand them to depict the progression and fluctuations of a courtly love-affair. This association of one poem to the next marks this anthology as the ancestor of the renga and haikai traditions.

Structure
The exact number of poems in the collection varies depending on the textual tradition. One online edition, which follows the Date Family text based on a manuscript prepared by Fujiwara no Teika, contains 1,111 poems. The collection is divided into twenty parts, reflecting older models such as the Man'yōshū and various Chinese anthologies. The organization of topics is however different from all earlier models, and was followed by all later official collections, although some collections like the Kin'yō Wakashū and Shika Wakashū scaled the model down to ten parts.

The following divisions of the Kokinshū mention the Japanese names of the parts, their modern readings, and their English translations.

Major poets of the Kokinshū include Ariwara no Narihira, Ono no Komachi, Henjō and Fujiwara no Okikaze, apart from the compilers themselves. Inclusion in any imperial collection, and particularly the Kokinshū, was a great honour.

Manuscripts

On October 20, 2010, Kōnan Women's University announced the discovery of a complete manuscript dating to c. 1220–1240. It is the oldest manuscript to contain both the Chinese and Japanese prefaces. It is split into two volumes, 15.9 cm tall by 14.6 cm wide, totaling 429 pages containing all 1111 poems. It is thought to be a copy of a manuscript made by Fujiwara no Teika, but the identity of the copier is unknown. The manuscript was purchased from a used book store in 1982 for 4,280,000 yen.

See also
 List of Kokinshū poets
List of National Treasures of Japan (writings: Japanese books)
 Shin Kokin Wakashū
 Heian literature
 Minamoto no Tōru
 Gosen Wakashū

Notes

References

External links
 Manuscript scans at Waseda University Library: 1 volume (unknown year), 2 volumes (unknown year), 1 volume (unknown year), 1553 (Sanjōnishi Kin'eda), 1510? (Ichijō Fuyuyoshi)

 
Japanese poetry anthologies
Late Old Japanese texts
Heian period in literature
10th century in Japan
Waka (poetry)
10th-century Japanese books